The 1962 Florida A&M Rattlers football team was an American football team that represented Florida A&M University as a member of the Southern Intercollegiate Athletic Conference (SIAC) in the 1962 NCAA College  Division football season. In their 18th season under head coach Jake Gaither, the Rattlers compiled a 9–1 record, were ranked No. 1 in the final 1962 AP small college poll and No. 2 in the final UPI coaches poll, and suffered its sole loss to Jackson State in the Orange Blossom Classic.

The team included halfback Bob Hayes who tied the world record for the 100-yard dash. The team's statistical leaders included Robert Paremore with 629 rushing yards, 10 touchdowns and 64 points scored, Jim Tullis with 957 passing yards, and Al Denson with 461 receiving yards.

Schedule

References

Florida AandM
Florida A&M Rattlers football seasons
NCAA Small College Football Champions
Black college football national champions
Florida AandM Rattlers football